Anarchy, My Dear is the fifth studio album by American alternative rock band Say Anything. It was released on March 13, 2012 through Equal Vision Records. It is their last album with drummer Coby Linder, who left the band in December 2012.

Background 
On July 13, 2011, vocalist Max Bemis announced that Say Anything had been signed to independent label Equal Vision Records. They recorded Anarchy, My Dear from August 2011 to the end of September 2011 with ...Is a Real Boy producer, Tim O'Heir. Explaining the album's theme, Bemis said,

Artwork 
"We thought we could best represent what the album means by using the symbolism of a burning flag stitched onto an actual flag. The image represents a championing of the ’cause’ of struggling against the rules and regulations that dictate our thinking.”

Release 
On December 19, 2011 Say Anything streamed their first single from the album called "Burn a Miracle." The track was officially released the following day to digital music retailers. On January 10, 2012 the album's track listing was revealed.

On February 4, 2012 the band released the second single from the album entitled "Say Anything". The song impacted radio on February 28, 2012. "Overbiter" impacted radio on September 11, 2012.

Reception

Anarchy, My Dear polarized critics, but received a 66 out of 100 on Metacritic, indicating generally favorable reviews. AbsolutePunk gave the album an 85%, writing that the record promises "anything could happen at anytime, and Bemis and company do their very best to shake up what has been expected from them as a band." Entertainment Weekly was positive, noting that "Like a good long-distance run, Anarchy rewards with bursts of sonic endorphins." Alternative Press complimented Sherri Dupree-Bemis' presence on the album, highlighting her contributions to a "loose, lively, fun record" and awarding the album 3.5 out of 5 stars. In a mixed review, The A.V. Club wrote that Bemis "padded Anarchy with lushness, delicacy, and nuance. The problem is, Bemis' nuance screeches louder than distortion."

Track listing

References

2012 albums
Equal Vision Records albums
Say Anything (band) albums